Crack of dawn may refer to:

Crack of Dawn, a Canadian band
Crack ov Dawn, a French band
Crack o' Dawn, a 1925 silent film